Versatile is the 38th studio album by Van Morrison, released on 1 December 2017 by Caroline. His second release of the year, it entered the Top 40 in six countries, including the UK. The album consists of some originals, both new and older, mixed with jazz standards.

Recording
The first track, "Broken Record", is an original composition whose opening riff traces back to "Heathrow Shuffle", an instrumental Morrison played from around 1974 in concerts, and is included on the Live at Montreux 1980/1974 DVD. Another original, "Affirmation", was based on a previously-released "Sax Instrumental No. 1" from a 1999 CD single for "Back on Top".

Critical reception
The Guardian describes the album as a "lively trip through the swing songbook", "a curious little joy of a record", and "very much a mood album, gently swinging".

Track listing
"Broken Record" (Morrison)
"A Foggy Day" (George Gershwin, Ira Gershwin)
"Let's Get Lost" (Jimmy McHugh, Frank Loesser)
"Bye Bye Blackbird" (Ray Henderson, Mort Dixon)
"Skye Boat Song" (Traditional; arranged by Morrison)
"Take It Easy Baby" (Morrison)
"Makin' Whoopee" (Gus Kahn, Walter Donaldson)
"I Get a Kick Out of You" (Cole Porter)
"I Forgot That Love Existed" (Morrison)
"Unchained Melody" (Alex North, Hy Zaret)
"Start All Over Again" (2017 Version) (Morrison)
"Only a Dream" (2013 Version) (Morrison)
"Affirmation" (Morrison)
"The Party's Over" (Jule Styne, Betty Comden, Adolph Green)
"I Left My Heart in San Francisco" (George Cory, Douglass Cross)
"They Can't Take That Away from Me" (George Gershwin, Ira Gershwin)

Charts

References

2017 albums
Van Morrison albums
Albums produced by Van Morrison